"Hang on Now" is a song by Kajagoogoo from their 1983 debut album, White Feathers.

The song peaked at No. 13 in the UK and reached No. 78 on the Billboard Hot 100 in the US. This was the band's last single to be released with Limahl on vocals, as he began a solo career the following year.

Track listing
7" EMI 5394 (UK)

 "Hang on Now" – 3:22
 "Hang on Now" (Instrumental) – 3:24

12" 12EMI 5394 (UK)

 "Hang on Now" (Extended Version) – 6:18
 "Introduction" – 5:10
 "Hang on Now" – 3:23

7" 1077617 (France)

 "Hang on Now" (US Mix) – 3:40
 "Hang on Now" (Instrumental) – 3:24

7" B-8171 (US & Canada)

 "Hang on Now" – 3:25
 "Kajagoogoo" (Instrumental) – 3:10

 "Hang on Now" is a remixed version for the US and Canada

Charts

References

Kajagoogoo songs
1983 songs